This is a list of diseases starting with the letter "L".

La

Lab–Lam
 Labrador lung
 Labyrinthitis
 Lachiewicz–Sibley syndrome
 Lacrimo-auriculo-dento-digital syndrome
 Lactate dehydrogenase deficiency type A
 Lactate dehydrogenase deficiency type B
 Lactate dehydrogenase deficiency type C
 Lactate dehydrogenase deficiency
 Lactic acidosis congenital infantile
 Ladda–Zonana–Ramer syndrome
 Lafora disease
 Lagophthalmia cleft lip palate
 Lambdoid synostosis familial
 Lambert syndrome
 Lambert–Eaton myasthenic syndrome (Lambert–Eaton paraneoplastic cerebellar degeneration)
 Lambert–Eaton syndrome
 Lamellar ichthyosis
 Lamellar recessive ichthyosis

Lan–Lap
 Landau–Kleffner syndrome
 Landouzy–Dejerine muscular dystrophy
 Landy–Donnai syndrome
 Langdon Down
 Langer–Nishino–Yamaguchi syndrome
 Langer–Giedion syndrome
 Langerhans cell granulomatosis
 Langerhans cell histiocytosis
 Laparoschisis
 Laplane–Fontaine–Lagardere syndrome

Lar–Lat
 Large B-cell diffuse lymphoma
 Laron-type dwarfism
 Larsen-like osseous dysplasia dwarfism
 Larsen-like syndrome lethal type
 Larsen syndrome craniosynostosis
 Larsen syndrome, dominant type
 Larsen syndrome, recessive type
 Larsen syndrome
 Laryngeal abductor paralysis mental retardation
 Laryngeal carcinoma
 Laryngeal cleft
 Laryngeal neoplasm
 Laryngeal papillomatosis
 Laryngeal web congenital heart disease short stature
 Laryngocele
 Laryngomalacia dominant congenital
 Laryngomalacia
 Larynx atresia
 Lassa fever
 Lassueur–Graham–Little syndrome
 Late onset dominant cone dystrophy
 Lateral body wall defect
 Laterality defects dominant
 Lattice corneal dystrophy type 2

Lau–Lax
 Launois–Bensaude adenolipomatosis
 Laurence–Prosser–Rocker syndrome
 Laurence–Moon–Bardet–Biedl syndrome
 Laurin–Sandrow syndrome
 Laxova–Brown–Hogan syndrome

Lb–Lc
 LBWC - amniotic bands
 LBWD syndrome
 LCHAD deficiency

Le

Lea–Leh
 Lead poisoning
 Leao Ribeiro Da Silva syndrome
 Learman syndrome
 Leber military aneurysm
 Leber optic atrophy
 Leber's disease
 Lecithin cholesterol acyltransferase deficiency
 Ledderhose disease
 Lee–Root–Fenske syndrome
 Left ventricle-aorta tunnel
 Left ventricular hypertrophy
 Leg absence deformity cataract
 Legg–Calvé–Perthes syndrome
 Legionellosis
 syn: Legionnaires' disease
 Lehman syndrome

Lei–Ler
 Leichtman–Wood–Rohn syndrome
 Leifer–Lai–Buyse syndrome
 Leigh disease
 Leigh syndrome, French Canadian type
 Leiner disease
 Leiomyoma
 Leiomyomatosis familial
 Leiomyomatosis of oesophagus cataract hematuria
 Leiomyosarcoma
 Leipala–Kaitila syndrome
 Leishmaniasis
 Leisti–Hollister–Rimoin syndrome
 Lemierre's syndrome
 Lennox–Gastaut syndrome
 Lentiginosis in context of NF
 Lenz–Majewski hyperostotic dwarfism
 Lenz microphthalmia syndrome
 Leprechaunism
 Leprosy
 Leptomeningeal capillary - venous angiomatosis
 Leptospirosis
 Leri pleonosteosis
 Léri–Weill dyschondrosteosis

Les–Let
 Lesch–Nyhan syndrome
 Lethal chondrodysplasia Moerman type
 Lethal chondrodysplasia Seller type
 Lethal congenital contracture syndrome
 Letterer–Siwe disease

Leu–Lev
 Leucinosis
 Leukemia subleukemic
 Leukemia, B-Cell, chronic
 Leukemia, Myeloid
 Leukemia, T-Cell, chronic
 Leukemia
 Leukocyte adhesion deficiency syndrome
 Leukocyte adhesion deficiency type 2
 Leukocytoclastic angiitis
 Leukodystrophy reunion type
 Leukodystrophy, globoid cell
 Leukodystrophy, metachromatic
 Leukodystrophy, pseudometachromatic
 Leukodystrophy, Sudanophilic
 Leukodystrophy
 Leukoencephalopathy palmoplantar keratoderma
 Leukomalacia
 Leukomelanoderma mental retardation hypotrichosis
 Leukoplakia
 Levator syndrome
 Levic–Stefanovic–Nikolic syndrome
 Levine–Crichley syndrome

Lew–Ley
 Lewandowski–Kikolich syndrome
 Lewis–Pashayan syndrome
 Leydig cells hypoplasia

Lg–Lh
 LGCR
 LGS
 Lhermitte–Duclos disease

Li

Lic–Lin
 Lichen myxedematosus
 Lichen planus follicularis
 Lichen planus
 Lichen sclerosus et atrophicus
 Lichen spinulosus
 Lichstenstein syndrome
 Lida–Kannari syndrome
 Liddle syndrome
 Li–Fraumeni syndrome
 Light chain disease
 Ligyrophobia
 Limb deficiencies distal micrognathia
 Limb dystonia
 Limb reduction defect
 Limb scalp and skull defects
 Limb transversal defect cardiac anomaly
 Limb-body wall complex
 Limb-girdle muscular dystrophy
 Lindsay–Burn syndrome
 Lindstrom syndrome
 Linear hamartoma syndrome
 Linear nevus syndrome

Lip–Lis
 Lip lit syndrome
 Lipid storage myopathy
 Lipidosis with triglyceride storage disease
 Lipoamide dehydrogenase deficiency
 Lipodystrophy Rieger anomaly diabetes
 Lipodystrophy
 Lipogranulomatosis
 Lipoid congenital adrenal hyperplasia
 Lipoid proteinosis of Urbach and Wiethe
 Lipomatosis central non-encapsulated
 Lipomatosis familial benign cervical
 Lipomucopolysaccharidosis
 Lipoprotein disorder
 Liposarcoma
 Lisker–Garcia–Ramos syndrome
 Lison–Kornbrut–Feinstein syndrome
 Lissencephaly immunodeficiency
 Lissencephaly syndrome type 1
 Lissencephaly syndrome type 2
 Lissencephaly, isolated
 Lissencephaly
 Listeria infection
 Listeriosis

Lit–Liv
 Livedoid dermatitis
 Liver cirrhosis
 Liver neoplasms

Lo

Lob–Lou
 Lobar atrophy of brain
 Lobster hand
 Lobstein disease
 Localized epiphyseal dysplasia
 Locked-in syndrome
 Lockwood–Feingold syndrome
 Loffredo–Cennamo–Cecio syndrome
 Logic syndrome
 Loiasis
 Loin pain hematuria syndrome
 Long QT Syndrome
 Long QT syndrome type 1
 Long QT syndrome type 2
 Long QT syndrome type 3
 Loose anagen hair syndrome
 Loose anagen syndrome
 Lopes–Gorlin syndrome
 Lopes–Marques de Faria syndrome
 Lopez–Hernandez syndrome
 Lou Gehrig's disease
 Louis–Bar syndrome

Low
 Low birth weight dwarfism dysgammaglobulinemia
 Lowe–Kohn–Cohen syndrome
 Lowe oculocerebrorenal syndrome
 Lowe syndrome
 Lower limb anomaly ureteral obstruction
 Lower limb deficiency hypospadias
 Lower mesodermal defects
 Lowry–MacLean syndrome
 Lowry syndrome
 Lowry–Wood syndrome
 Lowry–Yong syndrome

Ls–Lt
 LSA
 L-transposition and ccTGA

Lu
 Lubani Al Saleh Teebi syndrome
 Lubinsky syndrome
 Lucey–Driscoll syndrome
 Lucky–Gelehrter syndrome
 Ludomania
 Lúes Congénita
 Lujan–Fryns syndrome
 Lumbar malsegmentation short stature
 Lumbar spinal stenosis
 Lundberg syndrome
 Lung agenesis heart defect thumb anomalies
 Lung cancer
 Lung herniation congenital defect of sternem
 Lung neoplasm
 Lupus anticoagulant, familial
 Lupus erythematosus
 Lurie–Kletsky syndrome
 Luteinizing hormone releasing hormone, deficiency of with ataxia
 Lutz–Richner–Landolt syndrome
 Lutz–Lewandowsky epidermodysplasia verruciformis

Ly

Lye–Lyg
 Lyell's syndrome
 Lygophobia

Lym

Lyme
 Lyme disease

Lymp

Lymph
 Lymph node neoplasm

Lympha–Lymphe
 Lymphadenopathy, angioimmunoblastic with dysproteinemia
 Lymphangiectasies lymphoedema type Hennekam type
 Lymphangiectasis
 Lymphangioleiomyomatosis
 Lymphangiomatosis, pulmonary
 Lymphangiomyomatosis
 Lymphatic filariasis
 Lymphatic neoplasm
 Lymphedema distichiasis
 Lymphedema hereditary type 1
 Lymphedema hereditary type 2
 Lymphedema ptosis
 Lymphedema, congenital
 Lymphedema
 Lymphedema–distichiasis syndrome

Lympho
 Lymphoblastic lymphoma
 Lymphocytes reduced or absent
 Lymphocytic colitis
 Lymphocytic infiltrate of Jessner
 Lymphocytic vasculitis
 Lymphoid hamartoma
 Lymphoma, AIDS-related
 Lymphoma, gastric non-Hodgkin's type
 Lymphoma, large-cell, immunoblastic
 Lymphoma, large-cell
 Lymphoma, small cleaved-cell, diffuse
 Lymphoma, small cleaved-cell, follicular
 Lymphoma
 Lymphomatoid granulomatosis
 Lymphomatoid Papulosis (LyP)
 Lymphomatous thyroiditis
 Lymphosarcoma

Lyn–Lys
 Lynch–Lee–Murday syndrome
 Lynch–Bushby syndrome
 Lyngstadaas syndrome
 LyP (lymphomatoid papulosis)
 Lysine alpha-ketoglutarate reductase deficiency
 Lysinuric protein intolerance
 Lysosomal alpha-D-mannosidase deficiency
 Lysosomal beta-mannosidase deficiency
 Lysosomal glycogen storage disease with normal acid maltase activity
 Lysosomal storage disease

Lists of diseases